Amy Khor Lean Suan (born 1958) is a Singaporean politician who has been serving as Senior Minister of State for Transport and Senior Minister of State for Sustainability and the Environment since 2020. A member of the governing People's Action Party (PAP), she has been the Member of Parliament (MP) representing Hong Kah North SMC since 2011.

Prior to entering politics, Khor was a valuer at the Inland Revenue Authority of Singapore (IRAS), senior lecturer at the National University of Singapore, and executive director at Knight Frank. She made her political debut in the 2001 general election as part of a five-member PAP team contesting in Hong Kah GRC. After the PAP team won with 79.74% of the vote, she became a Member of Parliament representing the Hong Kah North ward of Hong Kah GRC. Since then, she had retained her parliamentary seat in the 2006 general election by an uncontested walkover, and had later won consecutive elections as a solo PAP candidate in Hong Kah North SMC starting from the 2011 general election. She had since been serving as Minister of State and later Senior Minister of State at various Ministries.

Education 
Khor was educated at Alexandra Hill Primary School, Raffles Girls' School and Raffles Institution before she went to the National University of Singapore, where she completed a Bachelor of Science in estate management in 1981. In 1988, she completed a Master of Business Administration at San Jose State University. In 1997, she completed a Doctor of Philosophy in land management at the University of Reading.

Career 
Khor was a valuer at the Property Tax Division of the Inland Revenue Authority of Singapore from 1981 to 1987, before she became a senior lecturer at the National University of Singapore from 1989 to 1999. From 1999 to 2004, she was an executive director at Knight Frank.

Political career 
Khor entered politics when she contested as part of a five-member People's Action Party (PAP) team in the 2001 general election in Hong Kah GRC. The PAP team won with 79.74% of the vote against the Singapore Democratic Party, and Khor thus became a Member of Parliament representing the Hong Kah North ward of Hong Kah GRC. On 12 August 2004, she was appointed Mayor of the South West District and held this position until 26 May 2014.

During the 2006 general election, Khor joined a five-member PAP team contesting in Hong Kah GRC again and they won by an uncontested walkover this time. On 30 May 2006, she was appointed Senior Parliamentary Secretary at the Ministry of the Environment and Water Resources. On 1 April 2007, she was appointed Deputy Government Whip and held this position until 30 September 2015. On 1 November 2010, she was promoted from Senior Parliamentary Secretary to Minister of State at the Ministry of the Environment and Water Resources.

In the 2011 general election, Khor contested as a solo PAP candidate in the newly formed Hong Kah North Single Member Constituency (SMC) and won with 70.61% of the vote against the Singapore People's Party's Sin Kek Tong. She was appointed Minister of State at the Ministry of Health on 21 May 2011 and given an additional appointment as Minister of State at the Ministry of Manpower on 1 August 2012. On 1 September 2013, Khor was promoted to Senior Minister of State.

During the 2015 general election, Khor retained her parliamentary seat in Hong Kah SMC after winning 74.76% of the vote against the Singapore People's Party's Ravi Philemon. After the election, she became Senior Minister of State at the Ministry of the Environment and Water Resources and Ministry of Health. 

In the 2020 general election, Khor retained her parliamentary seat in Hong Kah SMC after winning 60.99% of the vote against the Progress Singapore Party's Gigene Wong. On 27 July 2020, she was appointed Senior Minister of State at the Ministry of Transport and Ministry of Sustainability and the Environment.

Personal life 
Khor is a Christian and she is married with three children.

References

External links
 
 Amy Khor on Parliament of Singapore

Members of the Parliament of Singapore
People's Action Party politicians
Singaporean women in politics
Singaporean politicians of Chinese descent
Raffles Girls' Secondary School alumni
National University of Singapore alumni
Raffles Institution alumni
Singaporean educators
Singaporean people of Teochew descent
Singaporean Christians
1958 births
Living people
Malaysian emigrants to Singapore
People who lost Malaysian citizenship
Naturalised citizens of Singapore
20th-century Singaporean educators